Jacques Colombier (1901–1988) was a French art director who designed the sets for many films during his career.

Selected filmography
 Everybody Wins (1930)
 My Childish Father (1930)
 Headfirst into Happiness (1931)
 Montmartre (1931)
 Beauty Spot (1932)
 His Best Client (1932)
 Toto (1933)
 Temptation (1934)
 Sapho (1934)
 The Midnight Prince (1934)
 School for Coquettes (1935)
 Antonia (1935)
 The King (1936)
 The Life and Loves of Beethoven (1936)
 Parisian Life (1936)
 The Club of Aristocrats (1937)
 The Kings of Sport (1937)
 Beethoven's Great Love (1937)
 Tricoche and Cacolet (1938)
 The Woman Thief (1938)
 Mother Love (1938)
 The Fatted Calf (1939)
 Nine Bachelors (1939)
 CIRCONSTANCES ATTÉNUANTES (1939)
 Prince Charming (1942)
 Happy Go Lucky (1946)
 The Revenge of Roger (1946)
 Night Express (1948)
 The Heroic Monsieur Boniface (1949)
 The Unexpected Voyager (1950)
 Edward and Caroline (1951)
 They Were Five (1952)
 Spring, Autumn and Love (1955)
 Gas-Oil (1955)
 Meeting in Paris (1956)
 Short Head (1956)
 The Gentleman from Epsom (1962)
 Maigret Sees Red (1963)
 That Tender Age (1964)

References

Bibliography
 Waldman, Harry. Maurice Tourneur: The Life and Films. McFarland, 2001.

External links

1901 births
1988 deaths
French art directors